Aplota palpella is a species of moth belonging to the family Oecophoridae. It is native to Europe.

References

Oecophorinae